Pompey is a town in the southeast part of Onondaga County, New York. The population was 7,080 at the time of the 2010 census. The town was named after the Roman general and political leader Pompey by a late 18th-century clerk interested in the Classics in the new federal republic.

History 
The area of Pompey was originally part of the territory traditionally occupied by the historic Onondaga, one of the Five Nations of the Iroquois tribes of the powerful Haudenosaunee, or Iroquois Confederacy. After the American Revolutionary War, when most of the Iroquois were forced to cede their land to the victorious United States, many of the Onondaga migrated to Canada. The British Crown awarded them land there for resettlement for their support during the war. New York State took over the former Iroquois lands and sold much of the public land for development (and speculation). It reserved part as the Central New York Military Tract. Veterans of the Revolution were awarded land grants in this tract as payments for service. The town was first settled by outsiders around 1789, as Yankees from New England and other migrants moved into western New York.

The town of Pompey was formed in 1789, but not completely organized until 1794, when Onondaga County was established. The original town was divided and sub-divided into many other towns in the region, including all of the towns of Fabius (1798), Tully, Preble, and Scott (the latter two now in Cortland County), along with parts of the towns of Spafford, Otisco (1806), LaFayette (1825), Onondaga (1794), Truxton and Cuyler (the latter two now in Cortland County).

European-American settlers improved the trail and developed it as the Genesee Road (1794) and then the Seneca Turnpike (1800), running through the villages of Cazenovia, Manlius and Onondaga Hollow (south of Syracuse). The segment of modern U.S. Route 20 (US 20), which connects Cazenovia and Skaneateles by way of Pompey and LaFayette, was not built until 1934.

The 1820 discovery of the Pompey stone was understood as proof of early European presence in North America, but it was decades later identified as a hoax.

The Oran District No. 22 Schoolhouse and Drover's Tavern at Oran are listed on the National Register of Historic Places.

Geography

The town is south of Syracuse. The eastern town line is the county line of Madison County.

US 20 is an east-west highway through the town. New York State Route 91 (NY 91), a north-south highway, intersects US 20 in Pompey hamlet. NY 92 cuts across the northwestern corner of Pompey.

Demographics

As of the census of 2000, there were 6,159 people, 2,154 households, and 1,761 families residing in the town. The population density was 92.7 people per square mile (35.8/km2). There were 2,272 housing units at an average density of 34.2 per square mile (13.2/km2). The racial makeup of the town was 97.56% White, 0.37% African American, 0.21% Native American, 0.96% Asian, 0.28% from other races, and 0.62% from two or more races. Hispanic or Latino of any race were 0.70% of the population.

There were 2,154 households, out of which 41.4% had children under the age of 18 living with them, 72.4% were married couples living together, 5.5% had a female householder with no husband present, and 18.2% were non-families. 14.7% of all households were made up of individuals, and 5.6% had someone living alone who was 65 years of age or older. The average household size was 2.86 and the average family size was 3.17.

In the town, the population was spread out, with 29.6% under the age of 18, 4.4% from 18 to 24, 27.8% from 25 to 44, 28.2% from 45 to 64, and 10.1% who were 65 years of age or older. The median age was 39 years. For every 100 females, there were 99.4 males. For every 100 females age 18 and over, there were 98.2 males.

The median income for a household in the town was $59,190, and the median income for a family was $64,442. Males had a median income of $42,212 versus $32,357 for females. The per capita income for the town was $27,970. About 2.5% of families and 3.9% of the population were below the poverty line, including 5.4% of those under age 18 and 2.2% of those age 65 or over.

Notable people 
 William Barnes Sr., attorney and author
Victory Birdseye, lawyer, postmaster and congressman
Jason W. Briggs (1821–1899), leader in the early history of the Latter Day Saint movement
William George Fargo, founder of Wells-Fargo and mayor of Buffalo
Frank Hiscock (1834–1914), member of the United States Congress
L. Harris Hiscock (1824–1867), brother of Frank Hiscock; New York State Assembly member and Onondaga County Surrogate Court judge
Leonard Jerome, stock broker and investment banker; maternal grandfather of British Prime Minister Winston Churchill
Sara Jane Clarke Lippincott, publisher of Little Pilgrim and the first woman journalist employed by the New York Times
Charles Mason, chief justice of Iowa (1838–1842) and U.S. commissioner of patents (1853–1857).
Erastus Dow Palmer, sculptor
Charles B. Sedgwick (1815–1883), U.S. congressman (1859–1863)
Horatio Seymour (1810–1886), two-time governor of New York
Silas J. Seymour, member of the Wisconsin State Assembly
James Shanahan, Brigadier General with distinguished combat service and numerous awards
Henry Warner Slocum, general for the Union during the Civil War and U.S. Congressman from Brooklyn
John Edison Sweet, engineer and professor at Cornell University, and a Dean at Syracuse University. His brother Homer Sweet, a poet and surveyor, wrote the New Atlas of Onondaga County, NY, in 1874, still used by local historians. Brother William Avery Sweet was a manufacturer of steel and refined technology.
Theodore Weld, leading abolitionist
Charles Augustus Wheaton (1809 – 1882), major abolitionist and supporter of the Underground Railroad

Education

School districts 
The town of Pompey covers part of four separate public school districts:
Fabius-Pompey Central School District
Fayetteville-Manlius Central School District
Jamesville-Dewitt Central School District
Cazenovia Central School District

Communities and locations in Pompey 
Atwell Corners – A location on the eastern town line near Hills Corners.
Berwyn – A location southwest of Pompey hamlet and west of Swift Corner.
Buellville – A hamlet at the northern town line on NY 92.
Clough Corners – A hamlet southeast of Pompey hamlet.
Delphi Falls – A hamlet near the eastern town boundary.
Hills Corners – A location near the east town line on US 20, east of Pompey Center.
Jamesville Reservoir – A reservoir in the northwestern corner of Pompey.
Jamesville Beach County Park – A county park south of Jamesville Reservoir.
Jerome Corner – A hamlet south of Pompey hamlet, near the southern town line on NY 91.
Oran – A hamlet in the northeastern corner of the town on NY 92, southeast of Beullville.
Pompey – A hamlet in the western part of the town at US 20 and NY 91.
Pompey Center – A hamlet east of Pompey hamlet on US 20. The Pompey Centre District No. 10 Schoolhouse was listed on the National Register of Historic Places in 1998.
Pompey Hill – A famous elevation (1728') in the town that allows a view of seven counties.
Pompey Hollow – A valley near the eastern town line.
Pratt's Falls County Park – A county park northeast of Pompey hamlet.
Salem Corner – A hamlet northeast of Pompey hamlet.
Stebbins Gulf – A valley in the western part of Pompey, north of The Tunnel.
Swift Corner – A hamlet south of Pompey hamlet and west of Jerome Corner.
The Tunnel – A valley in the western part of the town.
Watervale – A hamlet northeast of Pompey hamlet and west of Salem Corner.

References

External links
 Town of Pompey official website
  Historical links for Pompey

Syracuse metropolitan area
Towns in Onondaga County, New York
Populated places in New York (state)